Eusebius of Myndus was a 4th-century philosopher, a distinguished Neoplatonist. He is described by Eunapius as one of the links in the "Golden Chain" of Neoplatonism. 

He was a pupil of Aedesius of Pergamum. He devoted himself principally to logic and ventured to criticize the magical and theurgic side of the doctrine. By this he exasperated the later Emperor Julian, who preferred the mysticism of Maximus and Chrysanthius. 

Stobaeus collected a number of ethical dicta of one Eusebius, who may perhaps be identical with the Neoplatonist.

References

4th-century Romans
4th-century philosophers
Neoplatonists
Ancient Roman philosophers
People from Myndus